5Y or 5-Y may refer to:

5 years
5Y, IATA code for Atlas Air
5Y, the Aircraft registration code for Kenya
5 Whys, a question-asking technique for identifying causes of a defect or problem
5Y, the production code for the 1982 Doctor Who serial Kinda

See also
Y5 (disambiguation)